Khizergarh (Kanaur) is a village in Banur area of Mohali (SAS Nagar) at the 18th District in Punjab, India. In past years, it was a part of the Patiala District, and was inducted into SAS Nagar in recent years. Its coordinates are 30°35'3"N 76°45'21"E.

Climate

Khizergarh has a sub-tropical continental monsoon climate characterized by a seasonal rhythm: hot summers, slightly cold winters, unreliable rainfall and great variation in temperature. In winter, frost sometimes occurs during December and January. The city also receives occasional winter rains from the west.

Average temperature
Winter: Average temperatures in winter (November to February) remain at (maximum)  and (minimum) .
Spring: spring temperatures vary between (min)  (max).

External links 
 Wikimapia link
 Kamaljit Singh

Villages in Sahibzada Ajit Singh Nagar district